Beta-sarcoglycan is a protein that in humans is encoded by the SGCB gene.

The dystrophin-glycoprotein complex (DGC) is a multisubunit protein complex that spans the sarcolemma and provides structural linkage between the subsarcolemmal cytoskeleton and the extracellular matrix of muscle cells. There are 3 main subcomplexes of the DGC: the cytoplasmic proteins dystrophin (DMD; MIM 300377) and syntrophin (SNTA1; MIM 601017), the alpha- and beta-dystroglycans (see MIM 128239), and the sarcoglycans (see, e.g., SGCA; MIM 600119) (Crosbie et al., 2000).[supplied by OMIM]

References

Further reading

External links
 LOVD mutation database: SGCB